Burning Hearts (meaning "I'll eat your heart") is a 2022 Italian crime-drama film written and directed by . The film premiered at the Horizons section of the 79th edition of the Venice Film Festival. It marked the acting debut of singer Elodie.

Plot  
In the Gargano promontory live two families belonging to the Apulian mafia , the Malatesta and the Camporeale, who vie for control of the territory. The two families have had bloody disputes over the years, including the massacre of the family of Michele Malatesta in 1960 , which deeply marked the clan . More than forty years later, the two families seem to have established a truce , favored by a third family, the Montanari.

In this period of apparent calm Andrea, Michele Malatesta's favorite son and heir to the clan, falls in love with Marilena, wife of the boss Santo Camporeale, who is currently on the run. Marilena in turn falls in love with Andrea but, aware of being married and of the rivalry between the two families , only apparently dormant, she decides to see him only clandestinely. Michele makes his son promise to end this dangerous relationship, but the promise is not kept. The relationship soon becomes public knowledge and the two lovers are forced to flee, but the Camporeales take their revenge by killing Michele and so the two families, despite Don Vincenzo Montanari's attempts at mediation, return to war.

To pay homage to his father killed by the rival clan, Andrea is forced to return home together with Marilena who, driven out of the Camporeales for her betrayal and a prisoner in the Malatesta house, is carrying a child and collides with a harsh and bloody reality. Andrea, spurred on by his widowed mother to avenge the murder of the head of the family, is increasingly obsessed with eliminating every member of the rival family.

Cast  
     Elodie as Marilena Camporeale
     Francesco Patanè as  Andrea Malatesta
     Lidia Vitale as Teresa Malatesta
     Francesco Di Leva as  Giovannangelo
     Giovanni Trombetta as  Paky Malatesta 
     Giovanni Anzaldo as  Zigo Zago
     Brenno Placido as  Potito Montanari
     Tommaso Ragno as  Michele Malatesta
     Michele Placido as  Vincenzo Montanari

Reception
The film was generally praised by critics. For her performance Elodie was awarded the Ciak d'Oro as revelation of the year.

References

External links
 

2022 drama films
Italian drama films
Italian crime films